Spartan (SPRTN) is a protein that in humans is encoded by the SPRTN gene. It is involved in DNA repair.  Ruijs-Aalfs syndrome is an autosomal recessive genetic disorder.  Characteristics of this disorder are features of premature aging, chromosome instability and development of hepatocellular carcinoma.  Ruijs-Aalfs syndrome arises as a result of mutations in the SPRTN gene that encodes a metalloproteinase employed in the repair of protein-linked DNA breaks.

References

Further reading